The Bremen Soviet [or Council] Republic (German: Die Bremer Räterepublik) was an unrecognised revolutionary state in Germany formed in the immediate aftermath of the First World War. Although not formally declared until 10 January 1919, the regime it represented presided in the industrial-port city of Bremen from 14 November 1918 until its suppression on 2 February 1919 by army and irregular forces engaged by the government of the new German Republic in Berlin.  

On 10 November 1918, a Workers' and Soldier's Council deposed the oligarchic Senat that, within the German Empire, had governed the Free Hansa City of Bremen (Freie Hansestadt Bremen). After offering assurances for private property and soliciting the cooperation of existing administrative bureaucracy, on 6 January 1919, Council submitted itself to an election limited to members of the left-wing parties and aligned trade unions: the "Majority" Social Democrats (MSPD), the Independent Social Democrats (USPD), and the new formed Communists (KPD). On 10 January, the USPD-KPD majority declared the Bremer Räterepublik.

The Council Republic was riven by disagreement over the nature of its mandate, the management of a developing financial and supply crisis, and the accommodation of national parliamentary elections. When faced with the determination of the new MSPD-led national government to enforce its authority, it was unable to agree a common negotiating position. On 4 February 1919, a combination of regular army troops and irregular Freikorps occupied the city breaking a disorganised resistance.

Establishment

As an international port and industrial centre Bremen had a strong democratic-left tradition. In the last elections to the Imperial Reichstag, in January 1912, the Social Democrats (SPD) secured over half the vote, 53.4%. Left Liberals (Linksliberale) took another 41.4%. Just 5.1% went to the Conservatives. The traditional prerogatives of the city's principal employers and traders, nonetheless, were preserved in the eight-class franchise for the city's elected Bürgerschaft and in lifelong appointments to the executive Senat. In the wake of the deprivations and reverses of the Great War, the legitimacy of such oligarchic arrangements in city government collapsed as did those of the imperial regime in Berlin. Striking workers defied de-facto martial law, and soldiers transferred their allegiance from officers to their own elected councils.

Around noon on 6 November 1918, thousands of shipyard, dock and factory workers demonstrated on the marketplace before the Rathaus (City Hall). A soldiers' council formed among locally stationed army units, and a delegation of sailors from Kiel, had sought their support in resisting the reimposition of military command. After deliberations between the various delegations and political factions present, Adam Frasunkiewicz of the Independent Social Democrats (a left anti-war splinter from SPD) announced that workers would meet with the soldiers in a city-wide council. 

Following elections on 7 November, 180 workplace delegates joined 30 soldiers in a combined Workers’ and Soldiers’ Council. They formed an executive Action Committee (Aktionsausschuss) of initially 15 members but extended to 21 to include representatives of the trade unions and the MSPD who were seen to bring needed administrative expertise. Alfred Henke of the USPD was elected chair of the committee, and Hans Brodmerkel was elected as deputy for the "left-wing radicals", another SPD splinter who were soon to announce themselves as "International Communists".

On 14 November, Henke announced that the Council was displacing both the Bürgerschaft and Senat. Early the next day, he appeared with delegates on the balcony of the Rathaus and declared the Council "the representative of the entire people". A red flag was hoisted. His declaration made no promise of sudden or radical change. Citizens were assured that private property would be protected and plunderers summarily dealt with. Now that "democracy had been victorious", it called on members of the old government to cooperate with the new powers. Appearing to respect the Council as legislative successor to the Bürgerschaft, the Senat continued to direct the administrative bureaucracy more or less as before.

In the Council elections of 6 January, the MSPD sought to get around the restriction of the franchise to members of the three left parties by opening its ranks to large numbers of previously unaligned workers and civil servants. With 104 mandates, the SPD emerged the largest party. But combining their delegates, the Communists with 60 and the USPD with 59 were able to seize the initiative. On 10 January, with the declaration of a Räterepublik they cut ties with the MSPD and, in the city administration, with the remaining hold-overs from the Senat.

Deliberations and division

Nature of the revolutionary mandate 
The Council agreed no single vision as to how it should operate or contribute to the anticipated socialist reconstruction. The Communists insisted on the "dictatorship of the proletariat" but were divided as to what this might mean. One  faction, consistent with what were later understood as Leninist or Bolshevik principles, defended the party as the leading organisational form. Another, invoking the council communist ideas of Antonie Pannekoek and Karl Radek (both of whom had taught in the city's Social-Democratic party school), regarded both parties and trade unions as structures ultimately hostile to the democratic exercise of labour's power. The USPD was internally divided over the relation between workplace delegation and parliamentary representation, but generally saw the councils as transitional institutions that would facilitate the socialisation of the economy. 

In debating the questions of whether to open council elections to non-party workers and middle-class employees, and on whether to cooperate in the elections for a constituent National Assembly (scheduled for 19 January), the MSPD had been alone in expressing confidence in the broadest franchise. In opposition to the MSPD, Henke went so far as to suggest that the prospect of a bourgeois-parliamentary, as opposed to proletarian revolutionary, majority had been enhanced by the extension of the national franchise to women. Referring to their political Unmündigkeit (immaturity), he suggested that a deal more preparatory work was required before according women an equal voice. 

Women delegates, of which there was just three on the Council, protested the compromising of previous socialist commitments to gender equality. They noted that the Council had introduced unemployment benefits at only one third the rate for women as for men, and that as members of the Council their own compensation was a third less than that of their male colleagues. Henke's mistrust of women may have proved self-fulfilling. Disappointed in the Council, women struggling for recognition were drawn to the electoral equality accepted by the parties endorsing the national assembly.

Exclusion of the Majority Social Democrats 
On 19 November 1918, a resolution calling on workers' and soldiers' councils to convene a national convention in opposition to the National Assembly was carried in Council by a majority of 116 votes to 23. The left-wing radicals then called a mass meeting on the on November 22, which passed a resolution demanding the disarmament both of the middle-class and of Majority Social Democrats and their exclusion from the councils. The resolution was the basis for the founding of the “International Communists of Germany” (IKD) the following day. On the same day, however, the council of the Bremen garrison which, even in the absence of commissioned officers, represented a broad social cross-section, decided against the arming of a workers' militia (a "Red Guard"). If the arms depots were threatened, they would themselves impose martial law. Supporting the MSPD, they also prevented the USPD and IKD from seizing exclusive editorial control of the city's principal newspaper, the Bremer Bürger-Zeitung. 

The decisive break with the Majority Social Democrats was delayed until the new year Council elections, and the subsequent declaration of the Räterepublik. Even then, the moderating influence of the soldiers' delegates was sufficient when combined with the USPD to produce a small majority on the council in favour of accommodating the National Assembly elections

Political defeat and isolation 
The split decision on the national elections significantly reduced the authority of the council government. Its legitimacy received a further blow when the results of the 19 January poll were tabulated. In Bremen, the MSPD received 42% of the votes, the centrist German Democratic Party (DDP) 33.5%, the USPD 18.2%, all other parties (the Communists maintained their boycott) remained under 5%. 

Meanwhile, tensions between workers' and soldiers' delegates over the distribution of arms had resulted in near civil-war. On 14 January, soldiers from the Bremen garrison occupied bridges, the market square and the main station. Marines then advanced on the shipyards, whose workforce was a mainstay of the communists. Gunfire was exchanged before the Marines were persuaded to retire.

There was also a pending crisis of supply as the city exhausted its available funds. As a condition for further loans, the banks insisted not only on the restoration of the former financial administration, but also on free elections to a Bremen constituent assembly. 

On 18 January, against Communist opposition, the Council of People's Representatives agreed to schedule popular elections for a new legislative body for 9. March. When decision was put to the Workers' and Soldiers' Council, the Independent Social Democrats overcame the resistance of the Communists by matching their threat to resign from Council, a withdrawal of delegates that would have dissolved the Räterepublik with immediate effect. With armed supporters occupying a number of their offices, some left-wing members of the KPD tried to extort loans from the banks. But the action quickly collapsed, as did the attempt at a city-wide strike. 

The Bremen Communists, reorganised with the Spartakusbund as the KPD, supported an uprising against the MSPD-led regime in Berlin. When this "Spartakus uprising" failed on 12 January, there no longer seemed any near-term prospect of a councilist or "soviet" alternative to the National Assembly. The Räterepublik was isolated, and with the agreement to hold city elections, internally compromised.

Suppression 
Even before the proclamation of the Soviet Republic, representatives of Bremen's business community had sought Berlin's military intervention. The necessary forces were now at hand. A division of 3,000 regular troops gathered at Verden on 29 January 1919 under Colonel Wilhelm Gerstenberg. There were also around 600 volunteers who had joined forces as a Freikorps under Major Walter Caspari. Negotiations were attempted, with the council government being asked to rearm Bremen's returning 75th Infantry Regiment and to entrust it with internal security. When this was ignored, the new Reich defense minister, Gustav Noske (MSPD), gave the order to advance on the city.  

The Council government had no concrete defense plans. It mobilised about 1,000 defenders, of whom most had no combat experience. They were reinforced by 250 sailors from Cuxhaven, few of whom would have been familiar with the city. There were statements of solidarity from the workers' and soldiers' councils in Bremerhaven, Oldenburg and Hamburg, but no other timely assistance. A few hundred volunteers who had gathered in Hamburg under Ernst Thälmann never reached Bremen; and around 150 volunteers from Bremerhaven only arrived after the fighting had ended. The severest clashes, involving the deployment of light artillery and two tanks (one of which was destroyed), occurred in the working class districts Walle and Gröpelingen. The 1st Hanseatic Infantry Regiment No. 75. remained in barracks under a white flag signalling its neutrality. Twenty four government troops and twenty-eight armed workers were killed, along with twenty-nine civilians.

Aftermath 

In contrast to the end of the Bavarian Council Republic in Munich and to the suppression of the Spartacists in Berlin, there was only one documented case of a prisoner being shot "while trying to escape". Instead, a total of 269 supporters were disarmed and detained in the prison of Bremen-Oslebshausen, (among them the famous Worpswede painter Heinrich Vogeler). 

Elections for the Bremen Constituent Assembly were held as scheduled on March 9, 1919. The MSPD won 32.7% of the vote, .the USPD 19.2% and the KPD  7.7%.  A new Senat was formed between the MSPD and the bourgeois parties: the German Democratic Party (DDP) and the German People's Party (DVP). KPD took this as an opportunity to call, in April, for a political strike with the aim of reintroducing the council system and of securing the release those fighters still incarcerated in Oslebshausen. After being confronted with a barbed-wire blockade of Walle and Gröpelingen, the strikers were satisfied with a general amnesty. 

The new constitution of the free Hanseatic City of Bremen was promulgated on May 18, 1920. The  The Bürgerschaft's previously existing eight-class suffrage was abolished, with article 10 of the state constitution expressly providing for universal adult suffrage.

See also
 Aftermath of World War I
 Rat (council)
 Bavarian Soviet Republic
 Alsace Soviet Republic

References

External links
 Group Workers' Policy: The Bremen Left Radicals. From the history of the Bremen workers' movement until 1920. (PDF; 5,1 MB) (In German)
 The Bremerhaven Republic from a syndicalist perspective. (PDF; 894 kB) (In German)

1919 in Germany
1919 in Europe
States and territories disestablished in 1919
Communism in Germany
Early Soviet republics
Former countries in Europe
Former socialist republics
History of anarchism
History of Bremen (state)
States and territories established in 1919
German Revolution of 1918–1919